Patrick Wimmer (born 30 May 2001) is an Austrian professional footballer who plays as a midfielder for Bundesliga club VfL Wolfsburg and the Austria national team.

Club career
On 13 April 2022, Wimmer signed a five-year contract with VfL Wolfsburg, beginning with the 2022–23 season.

International career
Wimmer was called up to the senior Austria squad for the UEFA Nations League matches against  Croatia, Denmark, France and Denmark on 3, 6, 10 and 13 June 2022.

Career statistics

Club

International

Honours
Individual
Bundesliga Rookie of the Month: January 2022

References

External link

 Profile at the VfL Wolfsburg website
 
 U21 profile at ÖFB
 U19 profile at ÖFB

Living people
2001 births
Austrian footballers
Association football midfielders
Austria international footballers
Austria under-21 international footballers
Austria youth international footballers
Austrian Football Bundesliga players
Bundesliga players
FK Austria Wien players
Arminia Bielefeld players
VfL Wolfsburg players
Austrian expatriate footballers
Austrian expatriate sportspeople in Germany
Expatriate footballers in Germany